The Cork 20 Rally or Cork 20 International Rally is an annual motorsport rallying event run by the Munster Car Club and held in the vicinity of Cork in Ireland. The Cork 20 Rally was first held in 1912, with the original event named because it spanned 20 hours.

It is run as a round within the Irish Tarmac Rally Championship, and draws competitors from Ireland North and South, Britain, and continental Europe. The rally was part of the National Rally Championship between 1966 and 1976. It became a full international rally in 1977.

History
The event has been run in different parts of County Cork since the 1960s, with Kinsale acting as the main hub throughout the 1970s, and Cork city being home to the event a few times also. The final stage of the 1980 event started on Patrick Street and went through Grand Parade and the South Mall in front of thousands of spectators. In later years, the event was run in the north and east Cork regions, with some sections run in mid Cork also. The event returned to West Cork in 2010.

The format of the original rally was similar to the Monte Carlo Rally, in that there were several starting points; Cork, Dublin and Galway. The cars would then meet at a designated town (for example Clonmel). The final leg would then run from that town into Cork city. The roads were not officially closed for these early events.

The event has been run by various organisers since 1912. In the 1950s, the Cork and Munster Motorcycle Club, based at the neo-classical building Vernon Mount, gave their support to the Cork 20 Rally. With various affiliations, the Cork Motor Club became active in motorsport in the Cork area from 1976 onwards. As of 2019, the event was run by the Munster Car Club.

2007 
In 2007, WRC drivers Sébastien Loeb (C4 WRC), Daniel Sordo (Xsara WRC), and Mikko Hirvonen (Focus RS WRC 06/07) all started the rally, heading a field of 130 of which 17 were World Rally Cars. Sébastien Loeb won the competition after two days and 14 stages.

2019 
The 2019 CB Toolhire Cork 20 International Rally event took place on 28 and 29 September 2019. The rally was the final counting round of the Irish Tarmac Rally Championship, a counting round of the ERT Celtic Rally Trophy, Southern 4 Rally Championship & South East Stages Rally Championship.

A total of 187 entries were enlisted to the event. The overall winners were the International Class entrants Marty McCormack and Barney Mitchell in a Volkswagen Polo R5. The 'national section' of the rally was won by Damian Toner & Michael Coady competing in the Modified Class. The Junior Class winners were Kieran Reen & Mark O'Leary.

2020 
The rally was scheduled to take place on 26 and 27 September 2020. Because of the on-going restrictions to address the COVID-19 pandemic in Ireland, on 25 June 2020 the Munster Car Club board of directors took a decision to cancel the 2020 rally. The Irish Tarmac Rally Championship had already been cancelled in late April.

2021
The event was provisionally planned as a stage of the FIA ERT Celtic Rally Trophy on 25-26 September 2021. However, as the COVID-19 pandemic continued into 2021 and all motorsports events in Ireland remained suspended, the Irish Tarmac Rally Championship, which traditionally featured Cork 20 Rally, was cancelled. At the end of May 2021, as the vaccinations were progressing, Motorsport Ireland announced that motorsports events could resume from 7 June 2021, subject to local restrictions. There was no championship, but some event dates were announced.

The organisers also featured a 4km Saturday shakedown stage in Kartworld Complex, Watergrasshill. This was the first rally event in Ireland in the 18 months since the first COVID-19 lockdown. The event attracted 165 entries, with 151 starting on the day. The overall winners were Callum Devine and Brian Hoy in a Ford Fiesta R5.

References

Sports competitions in County Cork
Motorsport competitions in Ireland
Rally competitions in Ireland